Ulla Birgitta Elisabeth Jäfvert (later Fahlén; born 16 April 1946) is a Swedish swimmer who won a silver medal in the 4 × 100 m freestyle relay at the 1966 European Aquatics Championships. Two years earlier at the 1964 Summer Olympics she finished fifth in the same event.

References

1946 births
Swimmers at the 1964 Summer Olympics
Swedish female freestyle swimmers
Living people
Swimmers from Stockholm
Olympic swimmers of Sweden
European Aquatics Championships medalists in swimming
20th-century Swedish women